Timothy Walton may refer to:

Timothy Walton (cricketer, born 1967), English cricketer who played for Cornwall
Tim Walton (cricketer, born 1972), English cricketer who played first-class cricket
Tim Walton (softball) (born 1972), former baseball player and softball coach
Tim Walton (American football) (born 1971), defensive coordinator